The Atle class comprises five icebreakers built for the Swedish and Finnish Transport Agency. The two Finnish ships, Urho and Sisu, are sometimes considered a separate class, but all are operationally identical.

The ships were built by Wärtsilä Helsinki Shipyard in Finland and entered service in the mid to late 1970s. The maneuvering system, incorporating dual rudders and dual bow propellers, represented significant technical innovation. They are also notable for their high level of crew comfort (for their time), to a point where Urho has served the Finnish government as a VIP transport.

Ships
 Atle, Sweden, commissioned 1974
 Urho, Finland, commissioned 1975
 Frej, Sweden, commissioned 1975
 Sisu, Finland, commissioned 1976
 Ymer, Sweden, commissioned 1977

External links 
 

Icebreakers of Finland
Icebreakers of Sweden
Auxiliary icebreaker classes